Dorr may refer to:

 Dorr (surname)
 Dorr, Iran, a village in Isfahan Province, Iran
 Dorr Township, McHenry County, Illinois
 Dorr Township, Michigan
 Dorr, Michigan

See also 
 Door (disambiguation)
 Dorr Rebellion
 Wilmer Cutler Pickering Hale and Dorr, American law firm